The .400/375 Belted Nitro Express, also known as the .400/375 Holland & Holland and the .375 Velopex is a rifle cartridge designed by Holland & Holland and introduced in 1905.

Development
The .400/375 Belted Nitro Express was developed to compete with the 9.5×57mm Mannlicher–Schönauer, marketed in the UK and British Empire as the .375 Rimless Nitro Express 2 inch.

The cartridge is unique in that it was the first ever cartridge to use a belted rim.  The addition of a belt to a rimless cartridge design provided the advantage of allowing for correct headspacing of highly tapered cartridges (an advantage of rimmed cartridges) and smooth feeding through magazine rifles (the advantage of rimless cartridges).

The .400/375 Belted Nitro Express almost died at birth, as in 1905 a Berlin gunmaker, Ottoman Bock, designed the 9.3×62mm to fit into the Model 1898 Mauser bolt-action rifle, this cartridge easily eclipsed both the 9.5×57mm and the .400/375 Belted NE. In 1912 Holland & Holland created the .375 Holland & Holland Magnum utilising the same caliber in a much larger belted case, and the .400/375 Belted NE faded from production.

Kynoch still manufacture .400/375 Belted NE ammunition with a lighter loading.

See also
List of rifle cartridges
9 mm rifle cartridges
Nitro Express

References

Footnotes

Bibliography
 Barnes, Frank C. & Amber, John T., Cartridges of the World, DBI Books, Northfield, 1972, .
 Ganyana, The .375 H&H Magnum, African Hunter, Vol.5 No.6, Dec 1999 (Archived 2015-01-03), retrieved 31 Dec 14.
 Kynoch Ammunition, Big Game Cartridges, kynochammunition.co.uk, retrieved 30 Dec 14.

Pistol and rifle cartridges
British firearm cartridges
Holland & Holland cartridges